The Court of Appeal for Nova Scotia (Nova Scotia Court of Appeal or NSCA) is the highest appeal court in the province of Nova Scotia, Canada. There are currently 8 judicial seats including one assigned to the Chief Justice of Nova Scotia. At any given time there may be one or more additional justices who sit as supernumerary justices.
The court sits in Halifax, which is the capital of Nova Scotia. Cases are heard by a panel of three judges. They publish approximately 80 cases each year.

History
The Court of Appeal was established on 30 January 1993. From 1966 to 1993, appeals pursuant to Supreme Court cases were heard by the Appellate Division of the Supreme Court and, prior to 1966, by a panel of Supreme Court judges sitting en banc. The Chief Justice of the Court of Appeal is the Chief Justice of Nova Scotia. Prior to the establishment of the Court of Appeal, the Chief Justice was the Chief Justice of the Appeal Division (1966–1993) and, before 1966, of the Supreme Court.

Jurisdiction 
The court derives its power from legislation of the Nova Scotia legislature, the Judicature Act. It hears appeals from the Nova Scotia Supreme Court, Provincial Court of Nova Scotia, and various tribunals.

Only the Supreme Court of Canada has jurisdiction to hear appeals from decisions of the Nova Scotia Court of Appeal; in practice this happens a few times a year.

Judges

Supernumerary

Past judges

Chief Justice of Nova Scotia
The Chief Justice of Nova Scotia is the highest position in the Nova Scotia judiciary. Since the creation of the Court of Appeal, this title is held by the Chief Justice of the Court of Appeal. Prior to that the title was held by the Chief Justice of the Nova Scotia Supreme Court Appeal Division (1966–1993) or the Supreme Court (before 1966). For completeness the list includes Chief Justices of Cape Breton Island, which merged with Nova Scotia in 1820.

Chief Justices of Cape Breton Island
 William Smith (1798 -)
 William Woodfall (1803 -)
 Archibald Charles Dodd (1806–1820)

Chief Justices of Nova Scotia
 Jonathan Belcher (1754–1776)
 Charles Morris (1776–1778)
 Bryan Finucane (1778–1785)
 Isaac Deschamps (1785–1788)
 Jeremy Pemberton  (1788–1789)
 Sir Thomas Andrew Lumisden Strange (1789–1797)
 Sampson Salter Blowers (1797–1833)
 Sir Brenton Halliburton (1833–1860)
 Sir William Young (1860–1881)
 James McDonald (1881–1905)
 Sir Robert Linton Weatherbe (1905–1907)
 Sir Charles James Townshend (1907–1915)
 Sir Wallace Nesbit Graham (1915–1917)
 Robert Edward Harris (1918–1931)
 Sir Joseph Andrew Chisholm (1931–1950)
 James Lorimer Ilsley (1950–1967)
 Lauchlin Daniel Currie (1967–1968)
 Alexander H. McKinnon (1968–1973)
 Ian Malcolm MacKeigan (1973–1985)
 Lorne Clarke (1985–1998)

Chief Justices of the Court of Appeal
 Constance Glube (1998–2004)
 J. Michael MacDonald (2005–2019)
 Michael Wood (2019–present)

References

External links
Courts of Nova Scotia

Canadian appellate courts
Nova Scotia courts
1993 establishments in Nova Scotia
Courts and tribunals established in 1993